Tigo Music Sessions is the third live album by Colombian recording artist Juanes. The album was released in two commercial music formats, the first was on DVD format that was distributed through Colombian newspaper El Tiempo, in the editions of August 15 and 16 of 2014. The second was an exclusive release to commercial music streaming service Deezer, sponsored by Tigo Music released on August 15, 2014 by Universal Music Latin. The live album served to hold the promotion of his sixth studio album Loco de Amor.

Track listing

Release history

References

Juanes live albums
2014 EPs
2014 live albums
Live EPs
Universal Music Latino live albums
Spanish-language live albums